Paul Moyer Limbert (May 27, 1897 – December 24, 1998) was a clergyman, educator and Secretary General of the World Alliance of YMCAs.

Born in Pennsylvania, Limbert earned a bachelor's degree at Franklin and Marshall College in 1918 and divinity degree at the Lancaster Theological Seminary in 1922. An educator of the first order, Limbert lectured and taught at many American universities, eventually becoming president of Springfield College. He served there from 1946 to 1952.

Limbert was then selected to serve the highest post in all of the YMCA movement. In 1952, he was named Secretary General of the World Alliance of YMCAs in Geneva, Switzerland. During his tenure, the YMCA celebrated its centennial in 1955, and Limbert visited many YMCAs in over 60 nations, including Britain, France, and in Africa.

After his term ended, Limbert traveled, lectured and wrote articles dealing with YMCA history. In 1985, at age 88, he was named as the first inductee into the YMCA Hall of Fame. Limbert was also named as the association's most notable living leader, a "position" he held until his death at the age of 101 in 1998.

1897 births
1998 deaths
American centenarians
Men centenarians
American Christian clergy
Springfield College (Massachusetts)
Franklin & Marshall College alumni
YMCA leaders
20th-century American clergy
20th-century American academics